7000 danses (7000 Dances) is the fourth studio album by the French new wave band, Indochine. It was released in 1987 in France, Germany, Canada, Spain and Peru.

Track listing
Music by Dominique Nicolas, except track seven (Stéphane Sirkis). Lyrics by Nicola Sirkis.

The German CD release included an extended version of "La chevauchée des champs de blé".

Personnel

Indochine
Nicolas Sirchis: vocals
Dominique Nicolas: guitars, bass guitar, Fairlight, drum machine, backing vocals
Stephane Sirchis: guitars, synthesizers, backing vocals
Dimitri Bodianski: saxophone

Additional personnel
Anna Noakes: flute
Dina Bennett: piano
Lindsay Crisp: backing vocals
Warren Cann: drums
Preston Heyman: percussion
Mark Brzezicki: drums

References

External links
 Detailed album information

1987 albums
Indochine (band) albums